Harman is a surname of Germanic origin dating back before Christ.  Most notable, (Arminius) was the unifier of the early Germanic tribes against the Roman Empire.  In lower German the name is Hermann; in upper German it is Harman. Its early name relationship to Arminius who was German born and educated in Rome was discovered by Martin Luther. Arminius himself is said to have descended from the lower German tribes on coastal Germany who many originated as fisherman from the British isles.

The name, possibly one of the oldest known surnames, has seen many variations in spelling and is found in over 40 languages.
Spelling variations also include Hardman, Hartman, Hartmande, Hermande, Hartmann, Herman, Larmande, Armande, Arman, Armmand, Hermman, Larmand, Ehrman and Armand. Additional Phonetic variations exist. 

The term "Army" is also thought to be derived from the name. This is not surprising as Arminius unified the German tribes and drove the Roman army into submission.

List of persons with the surname
 Adam Harman (born 1977), American pianist
 Alexander Harman (1921–1996), American judge
 Alfred Harman (around 1927), Australian engineer
 Alfred Hugh Harman (1841–1913), British photography pioneer
 Allan Harman (born 1936), Australian theologian
 Andrew Harman, British science fiction author
 Avraham Harman (1915–1992), Israeli diplomat and president of the Hebrew University of Jerusalem
 Barry Michael Harman (born 1952), American screenwriter
 Brad Harman (born 1985), Australian baseball player
 Brian Harman (born 1987), American golfer
 Brooke Harman (born 1985), Australian actress
 Buddy Harman (1928–2008), American drummer
 Charles Harman (1894–1970), British Court of Appeal of England and Wales judge
 Chris Harman (1942–2009), British journalist and left-wing political activist
 Chris Harman (composer) (born 1970), Canadian composer
 Denham Harman (1916–2014), American biogerontologist
 Fred Harman (1902–1982), American cartoonist
 Estelle Harman (1922–1995), American acting coach
 George Harman (British Army officer) (1830–1892)
 George Harman (1874–1975), Irish cricketer and rugby union player
 Gilbert Harman (1938–2021), American philosopher
 Glyn Harman (born 1956), British mathematician
 Graham Harman (born 1968), American philosopher
 Harjit Harman (born 1975), Indian Punjabi singer
 Harriet Harman (born 1950), British politician, MP for Camberwell and Peckham (1982–present)
 Harry Harman (1913–1976), American statistician
 Harvey Harman (1900–1969), American football coach
 Hugh Harman (1903–1982), American animator and film producer
 Jack Harman (1920–2009), British Army officer
 James Harman (1946–2021), American blues harmonica player, singer, and songwriter
 Jane Harman (born 1945), American politician, member of the House of Representatives for California's 36th district (2001–present)
 Jasmine Harman (born 1975), British television presenter (A Place in the Sun)
 Jennifer Harman (born 1964), American poker player
 Sir Jeremiah Harman (judge) (1930–2021) controversial English High Court Judge who resigned in 1998
 Jeremiah Harman Esq. (1764–1844) English banker
 John Harman (British politician) (born 1950), British civil servant, former chairman of the Environment Agency
 John B. Harman (1907–1994), British physician, expert witness in the trial of John Bodkin Adams
 John Pennington Harman (1914–1944), British soldier, recipient of the Victoria Cross
 Katie Harman (born 1980), American singer, actress, and Miss America
 Louise Harman (stage name Lady Sovereign), (born 1985), British rapper
 Ľubomír Harman (born 1962), Slovak spree killer responsible for the 2010 Bratislava shooting
 Mark Harman (translator) (born 1951), Irish translator
 Mark Harman (computer scientist), British computer scientist
 Moses Harman (1830–1910), American schoolteacher, publisher, and activist
 Nigel Harman (born 1973), British actor (EastEnders)
 Oren Harman (born 1973), Israeli writer and academic
 Pete Harman (born 1919), American businessman, co-founder of Kentucky Fried Chicken
 Richard Harman (politician) (ca 1621–1646), English politician
 Richard Harman (cricketer) (1859–1927), New Zealand sportsman
 Richard Harman (journalist), New Zealand broadcaster
 Richard James Strachan Harman (1826–1902), Irish-born New Zealand early settler
 Richard Strachan De Renzy Harman (1896–1953), New Zealand architect
 Roger Harman (born 1941), English cricketer
 Sabrina Harman (born 1978), American soldier
 Samuel Bickerton Harman (1819–1892), Canadian lawyer, accountant, politician and civil servant, Mayor of Toronto (1869–1870)
 Sidney Harman (1918–2011), American businessman
 Thomas Harman (fl. 1566), English author
 Tom Harman (born 1941), American regional politician
 Tony Harman (1912–1999), English farmer
 William Harman (1869–1962), Irish cricketer
 Willis Harman (1918–1997), American academic
 Zina Harman (1914–2013), Israeli politician, Member of the Knesset (1969–1974)

Fictional characters
 Beth Harman, the main character in The Queen's Gambit
 Joe Harman, the main male character in Neville Shute's novel A Town Like Alice

See also 

 Halman (surname)
 Holman (surname)
 Hallman (disambiguation)

Surnames
English-language surnames
Surnames of English origin
Surnames of German origin
Surnames of British Isles origin
German-language surnames